Ashby Institute F.C. was an English football club based in Ashby, Scunthorpe.

History
The club was a member of the Midland League from 1968 to 1982, with a best finish of 3rd in 1974. The club turned down the opportunity to join the newly formed Northern Counties East League, instead returning to the Scunthorpe & District Football League. They were regular participants in the FA Cup, reaching the 3rd Qualifying Round in 1953.

References

Defunct football clubs in England
Midland Football League (1889)
Defunct football clubs in Lincolnshire
Association football clubs disestablished in 1989
Association football clubs established in 1917